Christian Döring is a retired slalom canoeist who competed for East Germany in the 1960s and 1970s.

He won five medals at the ICF Canoe Slalom World Championships with two golds (K-1 team: 1967, 1973), two silvers (K-1: 1971; K-1 team: 1971) and a bronze (K-1 team: 1975).

References
Overview of athlete's results at canoeslalom.net

German male canoeists
Possibly living people
Year of birth missing
Medalists at the ICF Canoe Slalom World Championships